East Timor–United States relations refer to the bilateral relations between East Timor and the United States.

History 

Timor-Leste maintains an embassy in Washington, D.C., as well as a Permanent Mission in New York City at the United Nations. The United States has a large bilateral development assistance program, $20.6 million in 2007, and also contributes funds as a major member of a number of multilateral agencies such as the Asian Development Bank and the World Bank. The U.S. Peace Corps has operated in Timor-Leste since 2002, but it suspended operations in May 2006 due to unrest and instability.

The U.S. embassy in Timor-Leste is located at Praia de Coqueiros, Dili. Thomas Daley is the Chargé d’Affaires ad interim. Mark Anthony White is the USAID Mission Director. Roberto Quiroz is the Political/Economic/Commercial Affairs Officer. Major Ron Sargent is the U.S. Department of Defense Representative.

Aid

Political Process Development
USAID began supporting the development of effective democratic electoral and political processes in Timor-Leste in 1999. Between 2001 and 2008, USAID gave $2,215,997 to the International Foundation for Electoral Systems to develop an electoral framework and processes, $3,619,134 to the International Republican Institute to develop political parties, and $3,728,490 to the National Democratic Institute to increase citizen participation and local governance.

See also
 Foreign relations of the United States
 Foreign relations of East Timor

Notes

References

Major Sources

External links

History of Timor Leste - U.S. relations
 Embassy of the United States Dili, Timor-Leste

 
United States
Bilateral relations of the United States